Events in the year 2021 in Chile.

Incumbents
 President: Sebastián Piñera (RN)

Events
Ongoing — COVID-19 pandemic in Chile

January to March
4 January - The University Transition Test that replaced the PSU is carried out, with fewer questions and with a strict health protocol due to the pandemic.
7 January – Former GOPE sergeant Carlos Alarcón is found guilty of the murder of Camilo Catrillanca. A few days later he is sentenced to 16 years in prison.
30 January – A fire at San Borja Arriarán hospital in Santiago required 20 companies of firefighters to control, but the patients were all safely evacuated to nearby hospitals.
5 February – Hundreds protest and municipal buildings are set on fire in Panguipulli after police kill a street performer.
10 February – The government announces it will deport 2,000 undocumented immigrants, mostly from Venezuela. The town of Colchane, Tamarugal Province, has expanded from a population of 300 to 1,700 since 1 February.
11 February – Mónica Zalaquett, Minister of Women and Gender Equity, condemns comments by councilor Iván Roca (Independent Democratic Union) of Lota, Biobío Region, excusing his 33-year-old son′s rape of a 12-year-old girl because the girl had ″the body of a woman″.
15 February – COVID-19: 779,541 total cases since the outbreak of the pandemic, 19,624 deaths, 2,147,272 doses of vaccine administered
4 March – Tsunami alert following earthquakes near the Kermadec Islands, New Zealand

Scheduled events 
10-11 April – Scheduled date for the 2021 Chilean Constitutional Convention election. President Piñera proposed holding the election in May to allow greater vaccination.
21 November – Scheduled date for the 2021 Chilean general election, to elect the President and National Congress. In the 2021 elections 27 members of the Senate (out of a total of maximum 50) will be elected, replacing 20 outgoing senators.

Deaths

3 January – Manola Robles, journalist (b. 1948).
 20 January - Mario Gutiérrez, musician, member of Los Ángeles Negros (b. 1949)
 22 January - Juan Guzmán Tapia, judge (Augusto Pinochet's arrest and trial), (b. 1939).
27 January – Ignacio Tejeda, 17, tennis player; cancer.
7 February – Mario Osbén, 69, footballer (Colo-Colo, Cobreloa, national team); heart attack.
10 March – Tomás Vidiella, 83, film director and actor; COVID-19.
13 March – Uruguay Graffigna, 73, Uruguayan-Chilean footballer (San Luis de Quillota, Los Angeles Aztecs, PEC Zwolle); complications from COVID-19 and Alzheimer's disease.
19 March – Cristián Cuturrufo, 48, jazz trumpeter; COVID-19.
27 March – Eugenio Mimica Barassi, 71, writer (born 1949).
8 April – Elsa Bolívar, 91, painter.
22 April – Armando Jofré, 44, artist and puppet maker (31 Minutos); COVID-19.
6 May – Humberto Maturana, 92, philosopher and biologist (born 1928).
25 July – Fernando Karadima, 90, catholic priest accused of sexual abuse (born 1930).
25 September – Patricio Manns, 84, singer (born 1973)
3 October – Jorge Medina, 94, cardinal (born 1926).
5 October – Reinaldo Solari, 96, businessman (born 1925).

See also

Pacific Alliance
COVID-19 in South America

References

 
2020s in Chile
Years of the 21st century in Chile
Chile
Chile